Oman competed in the 2018 Asian Games in Jakarta and Palembang, Indonesia from 18 August to 2 September 2018 This event marks the 10th Asian Games appearance for Oman since making their debut in 1982.

In May 2018, the Oman Olympic Committee (OOC) approved Omani delegation to take part in 9 sporting events including athletics, swimming, shooting, football, field hockey, beach volleyball, tennis, sailing and weightlifting during the multi-sporting competition. In August 2018, the OOC released that 46 athletes took part in eight sporting events such as hockey, beach volleyball, swimming, sailing, weightlifting, shooting, tennis and athletics.

Athletics 

Oman entered six men's athletes to participate in the athletics competition at the Games.

Field hockey 

The Oman national field hockey team qualified to compete at the 2018 Asian Games after progressing through the Asian Games qualification round defeating Bangladesh in the Qualifiers final which was held in Oman during March 2018.

Summary

Men's tournament 

Roster

Pool B

Seventh place game

Sailing

Oman took part in the sailing competition at the Games with three sailors.

Men

Mixed

Shooting 

Oman entered their athletes to compete in the shooting competition at the Games.

Men

Women

Mixed team

Swimming 

Oman sent two men's swimmer to compete at the Games.

Men

Tennis 

Oman participated in the tennis competition at the Games with two athletes.

Women

Mixed

Volleyball 

Oman participated at the beach volleyball competition with four men's athletes.

Beach volleyball

Weightlifting 

Oman prepared one athlete to compete at the Games. Asad Sultan Obaid Al Battashi eliminated from the competition because he did not show himself up at the weigh-in.

See also 
 Oman at the 2017 Asian Indoor and Martial Arts Games
 Oman at the 2018 Asian Para Games

References 

Oman at the Asian Games
2018 in Omani sport
Nations at the 2018 Asian Games